Cherepanovo is a rural locality (a village) in Maloyazovsky Selsoviet, Salavatsky District, Bashkortostan, Russia. The population was 54 as of 2010. There are 3 streets.

Geography 
Cherepanovo is located 14 km northwest of Maloyaz (the district's administrative centre) by road. Pokrovka is the nearest rural locality.

References 

Rural localities in Salavatsky District